The Northern Railway was a non-operating subsidiary of the Southern Pacific Railroad during the 19th century, created primarily as a device to consolidate the management of a number of smaller subsidiary railroads. The initial railroad opened in 1876 from Woodland, California, to Williams; and extended to Willows in 1878, and to Tehama in 1882. In 1877, a line of the Northern Railway was built between Oakland and Martinez. By the time of its 1898 merger into Southern Pacific, it also controlled the Winters and Ukiah Railway, the Woodland, Capay and Clear Lake Railroad, the West Side and Mendocino Railroad, the Vaca Valley and Clear Lake Railroad, the San Joaquin and Sierra Nevada Railroad, the Sacramento and Placerville Railroad, the Shingle Springs and Placerville Railroad, the Santa Rosa and Carquinez Railroad, the Amador Branch Railroad, and the Berkeley Branch Railroad.

Sources

Predecessors of the Southern Pacific Transportation Company
Defunct California railroads
Railway companies established in 1871
Railway companies disestablished in 1898